Iván Casado Ortiz (born 6 July 1993) is a Spanish footballer who plays as a central defender for Murcia.

Career
Born in Dueñas, Palencia, Castile and León, Casado finished his formation at Real Valladolid, and made his senior debuts with the reserves in the 2012–13 campaign in Tercera División.

Casado played his first match as a professional on 7 June 2015, starting in a 4–2 home loss against UE Llagostera in the Segunda División championship.

References

External links

1993 births
Living people
People from Palencia
Sportspeople from the Province of Palencia
Spanish footballers
Association football defenders
Segunda División players
Segunda División B players
Tercera División players
Real Valladolid Promesas players
Real Valladolid players
CD Paracuellos Antamira players
CD Izarra footballers
CD Badajoz players
Salamanca CF UDS players
Real Murcia players